Radio Prača is a Bosnian regional public radio station, broadcasting from Pale-Prača, Bosnia and Herzegovina.

Radio Prača was launched in November 1997 by the municipal council of Pale-Prača from Bosnian Podrinje Canton. This radio station broadcasts a variety of programs such as music, sport, local news and talk shows. Program is mainly produced in Bosnian language and it is available in municipalities of Bosnian Podrinje area.

Estimated number of potential listeners of Radio Prača is around 31,200.

Radio Prača is also available via IPTV platform Moja TV on channel 196.

Frequencies
The program is currently broadcast on 2 frequencies:

 Pale-Prača 
 Goražde

See also 
List of radio stations in Bosnia and Herzegovina
Radio Goražde

References

External links 
 www.radiopraca.ba 
 www.praca.ba 
 Communications Regulatory Agency of Bosnia and Herzegovina

Prača
Goražde
Bosnian Podrinje Canton
Radio stations established in 1997